Madad Ali Sindhi is a famous Pakistani writer columnist and journalist who belongs to Sindh a southern province of Pakistan.

Early life
Madad Ali Sindhi was born to Allah Bux Qureshi on 12 October 1950 in Hyderabad city of Sindh, Pakistan. According to encyclopedia Sindhiana by Sindhi Language Authority Hyderabad, he got primary education from Fatima primary school Hyderabad, Sindh.He did his matriculation from Govt. Boys school Hyderabad. He received degree of B.A from Sachal arts and commerce college Hyderabad. He passed M.A from university of Sindh, Jamshoro. He started writing from 1968 as well as took part in politics. He remained organizer of Hyderabad Sindh for Awami League of Sheikh Mujibur Rahman in 1969. He is member of board of governors body of Sindhi Language Authority.

Books
History of Sindh by Culture Department of Sindh Pakistan.
Ancient Sindh
Koonja bee kaee koonja.
Duleh Darya Khan - The Forgotten Hero of Sindh by MIJTB Culture Department, Government of Sindh

Award
Writer Madad Ali Sindhi was rewarded with a presidential civil award pride of performance by Govt. Of Pakistan on 14 August 2021 regarding his rendered services in Sindhi literature.

References 

Pakistani writers
Sindhi people
1950 births
Recipients of the Pride of Performance
Living people